is a Japanese surname. Notable people with the surname include:

, tattoo artist | Brazil | SP

, manga artist
Eugene Amano, a Filipino-born NFL player
, physicist, inventor of blue LED light, 2014 Nobel laureate
, Japanese baseball player
, actor
, manga artist
, music composer
, manga artist
, aquarium designer and photographer
, Japanese footballer
, Japanese singer
, manga artist
, illustrator
, Japanese footballer
, Japanese columnist
, Director General of the International Atomic Energy Agency
, voice actress

Fictional characters
, the protagonist of Video Girl Ai
, the protagonist of Get Backers
, the protagonist of Urotsukidōji
 of Urotsukidoji
 of Kanon
, an antagonist of Digimon Xros Wars
, a character in Digimon Xros Wars
, main character in Beyblade: Metal Fusion
, the protagonist of Future Diary
, main character in Yumeiro Patissiere
, a character in Blend-S

See also
Amano, 13th century King of the Hadiya Sultanate
Amano shrimp, a species of shrimp found in Asia

Japanese-language surnames